The videography of South Korean artist B.I.

Music videos

As lead artist

As featured artist

Cameo appearances

Other music videos

See also
 iKon videography

References

Videographies of South Korean artists